Hitler from Our Street (Hitler iz našeg sokaka) is a Yugoslav film directed by Vladimir Tadej. It was released in 1975.

External links
 

1975 films
Croatian war drama films
1970s Croatian-language films
Yugoslav war drama films
Jadran Film films
Yugoslav World War II films
Films set in Serbia
Films set in Yugoslavia